Reyes del Show is the season four of the 2017 edition of El Gran Show premiered on October 21, 2017.

On October 28, a special program called "El Otro Show" was presented, which celebrated the 30-year career of Gisela Valcárcel. For this reason the second week was presented on the following date.

Cast

Couples
The celebrities who would compete this season were scheduled to be the first three of the three seasons, but due to various issues, four of them were not part of the cast. Christian Domínguez did not participate in the season due to personal issues, so he had to pay a penalty for breach of contract. Anahí de Cárdenas and Belén Estévez did not participate due to injuries, while Andrea Luna's absence was not specified, until she announced days later that the producers of the program did not decide to call her for unspecified reasons. In the first week it was announced that Dominguez's replacement would be the dancer Edson Dávila (being the second dancer, after Lucas Piró, to participate as a hero) and that Karen Dejo would replace Estévez. On October 28, it was announced that former participant Leslie Shaw would return to the program to replace Anahí de Cárdenas, being paired with Waldir Felipa (Estévez's dance partner).

The dancers Maylor Pérez, Kevin Ubillus and Alexa Montoya were replaced by Sergio Álvarez, Pedro Ibáñez and Melanie Salazar, respectively.

Host and judges
Gisela Valcárcel and  Aldo Díaz returned as host while Morella Petrozzi, Carlos Cacho, Tilsa Lozano and Pachi Valle Riestra returned as judges. Belén Estévez, who was unable to participate in the show due to an injury, joined the season as the VIP judge. On December 9, actor & comedian Carlos Alcántara replaces Belén Estevéz.

Scoring charts 

Red numbers indicate the sentenced for each week
Green numbers indicate the best steps for each week
"—" indicates the couple(s) did not dance that week
 the couple was eliminated that week
 the couple was safe in the duel
  the couple was eliminated that week and safe with a lifeguard
 this couple withdrew from the competition
 the winning couple
 the runner-up couple
 the third-place couple

Average score chart 
This table only counts dances scored on a 40-point scale.

Highest and lowest scoring performances 
The best and worst performances in each dance according to the judges' 40-point scale are as follows:

Couples' highest and lowest scoring dances 
Scores are based upon a potential 40-point maximum.

Weekly scores 
Individual judges' scores in the charts below (given in parentheses) are listed in this order from left to right: Morella Petrozzi, Carlos Cacho, Tilsa Lozano, Pachi Valle Riestra, Belén Estévez.

Week 1: Acrobatic Bachata Night 
The couples danced acrobatic bachata in which the celebrities were blindfolded.

Oreykel Hidalgo, dancer who managed to reach the final with Karen Dejo and Vania Bludau in their respective seasons, danced with the two and then decided who would participate for the rest of the season, choosing the first. Finally, the production decided that Bludau would dance with Italo Valcárcel of the next week. 
Running order

Week 2: Dances with Chairs Night 
The couples (except those sentenced) danced jazz using chairs in the performance. In addition, the versus was made, where only two couples faced each other, the winner would take two extra points plus the couples who gave their support votes.

Leslie Shaw,  former participant of the show, entered from this week as she replaced Anahí de Cárdenas, being paired with Waldir Felipa.
Running order

The duel*
César & Melanie: Eliminated
Edson & Gabriela: Safe

Week 3: Challenge Night 
The couples performed a dance in which they had to perform a specific challenge.
Running order

The duel*
Brenda & Pedro: Safe
Leslie & Waldir: Safe
Karen & Oreykel: Eliminated (but safe with the lifeguard)

Week 4: Switch-Up Under the Rain Night 
The couples performed one unlearned dance under the rain with a different partner selected by the production. In the little-train only the women participate dancing reggaeton.
Running order

The duel*
Edson & Gabriela: Eliminated
Vania & Ítalo: Safe

Week 5: Acrobatic Salsa Night 
The couples (except those sentenced) danced acrobatic salsa. In the little-train only the women participate dancing reggaeton.
Running order

The duel*
Leslie & Waldir: Safe
Lucas & Maru: Eliminated

Week 6: Semifinal 
The couples dance freestyle and acrobatic contemporary. This week, none couples were sentenced.
Running order

The duel*
Leslie & Waldir: Eliminated
Vania & Ítalo: Safe

Week 7: Final 
Individual judges' scores in the chart below (given in parentheses) are listed in this order from left to right: Morella Petrozzi, Carlos Cacho, Tilsa Lozano, Pachi Valle Riestra, Carlos Alcántara.

The three finalist couples performed freestyle, contemporary in which they were blindfolded and rumba.

Due to an injury, Vania Bludau had to withdraw from the competition, so he could not play the final of the season with Ítalo Valcárcel.
Running order (Part 1)

Dance chart
The celebrities and professional partners will dance one of these routines for each corresponding week:
 Week 1: Bachata (Acrobatic Bachata Night)
 Week 2: Jazz & the versus (Dances with Chairs Night)
 Week 3: One unlearned dance (Challenge Night)
 Week 4: One unlearned dance & the little train (Switch-Up Under the Rain Night)
 Week 5: Salsa & the little train (Acrobatic Salsa Night)
 Week 6: Freestyle & contemporary (Semifinals)
 Week 7: Favorite dance, contemporary and rumba (Final)

 Highest scoring dance
 Lowest scoring dance
 Gained bonus points for winning
 Gained no bonus points for losing
 Danced, but not scored
In Italic indicate the dance performed in the duel

Guest judges

Notes

References

External links 

El Gran Show
2017 Peruvian television seasons
Reality television articles with incorrect naming style